Frank Byron Jevons (1858–1936) was a polymath, academic and administrator of Durham University.

Early life
He was educated at Nottingham High School and Wadham College, Oxford and appointed a lecturer in Classics at Durham in 1882.

Career
He was the first Censor of St Cuthbert's Society from 1892 until 1897, a role he performed with "skill and humanity". In 1897 he was appointed as Principal of Bishop Hatfield's Hall (retitled master in 1919 when it became Hatfield College), where he remained until 1922. He was the first principal not to be seen ordained clergyman. He also served as treasurer of the university from 1898 to 1902, as sub-warden from 1902 to 1909, as vice-chancellor of the university between 1910 and 1912 and pro vice-chancellor between 1912 and 1914 and 1916 to 1921.

He received an honorary DLitt from Durham University in 1895. He was Professor of Philosophy between 1910 and 1930 and presided at the inaugural meeting of the World Congress of Philosophy in 1923. One of the last Victorian polymaths, in the twenty years before and after 1900, he gave himself successively to the study of classics, philosophy, sociology, history, anthropology, and comparative religion.

A portrait hangs in the refectory of Hatfield College.

Social and national issues
He was concerned with social and national issues, especially the education of the working classes and of women.

Major writings
He was author of eighteen scholarly texts some of which, for example A History of Greek Literature: From the Earliest Period to the Death of Demosthenes (1886), An Introduction to the Study of Comparative Religion (1908), and Comparative Religion (Cambridge Manual of Science and Literature) (1913) remain in print.

He also wrote on other fields in which subsequent technical advances have been radical and rapid, such as evolution. Such works understandably are no longer commonly in print, but they remain of interest for their clarity, logic, and sound representation of the perspective of his day.

Other writings available online include:
 A Manual of Greek Antiquities (as co-author of Percy Gardner)
 An Introduction to the History of Religion
 Philosophy: What is It?
 The idea of God in early religions

List of works 

Jevons wrote, co-authored, or translated the following books (some titles may be duplicates):

References

External links
 
 
 
 

Academics of Durham University
1858 births
1936 deaths
People educated at Nottingham High School
Vice-Chancellors and Wardens of Durham University
Alumni of Wadham College, Oxford
Masters of Hatfield College, Durham